Volleyball events were contested at the 1991 Summer Universiade in Sheffield, England.

References
 Universiade volleyball medalists on HickokSports

U
1991 Summer Universiade
Volleyball at the Summer Universiade